Pandemis phaiopteron is a species of moth of the family Tortricidae. It is found in China (Shensi).

References

	

Moths described in 1978
Pandemis